The men's 800 metres at the 1950 European Athletics Championships was held in Brussels, Belgium, at Heysel Stadium on 23 and 26 August 1950.

Medalists

Results

Final
26 August

Heats
23 August

Heat 1

Heat 2

Heat 3

Participation
According to an unofficial count, 18 athletes from 12 countries participated in the event.

 (2)
 (1)
 (2)
 (2)
 (2)
 (1)
 (1)
 (1)
 (1)
 (2)
 (2)
 (1)

References

800 metres
800 metres at the European Athletics Championships